Bouknight is a surname. Notable people with the surname include:

James Bouknight (born 2000), American basketball player
Kip Bouknight (born 1978), American baseball player

See also
Simon Bouknight House